Salvatore J. Cesario (born July 4, 1963) is a former American football offensive guard in the National Football League for the Dallas Cowboys. He played college football at Cal Poly San Luis Obispo.

Early years
Cesario attended Bellarmine College Preparatory, where he played as a tight end.

He walked-on at Division II Cal Poly San Luis Obispo. He was awarded a football scholarship two weeks after beginning to practice with the team. He became a three-year starter at left tackle.

Professional career

New York Jets
Cesario was drafted by the New York Jets in the twelfth round (328th overall) of the 1986 NFL Draft. He was waived on September 1, after struggling because he lacked size. On February 19, 1987, he was signed to participate in training camp. He was released on August 31.

Dallas Cowboys
After the NFLPA strike was declared on the third week of the 1987 season, those contests were canceled (reducing the 16 game season to 15) and the NFL decided that the games would be played with replacement players. He was signed to be a part of the Dallas Cowboys replacement team that was given the mock name "Rhinestone Cowboys" by the media. He started 3 games at left guard. He was cut on October 20, at the end of the strike.

Miami Dolphins
On March 23, 1988, he was signed as a free agent by the Miami Dolphins. He was released on August 23.

Personal life
After football, he became the Global Sales and Marketing Manager at Micro-Pak Ltd.

References

1963 births
Living people
Players of American football from Stockton, California
American football offensive guards
Cal Poly Mustangs football players
Dallas Cowboys players
National Football League replacement players
American people of Italian descent